Kayhan is an Iranian newspaper.

Kayhan may also refer to:

Given name
 Kayhan Kalhor, Kurdish musician

Surname
 Ahmet Kayhan Dede, Turkish Sufi
 Kemal Kayhan, Turkish volleyball player
 Khalid Kayhan, Afghan musician
 Tanju Kayhan, Austrian footballer

Businesses and organizations 

 Kayhan Space, an American aerospace software company

Turkish-language surnames